The Warriors Three are a group of fictional characters appearing in American comic books published by Marvel Comics. The characters served as supporting cast members in Thor. The Warriors Three are the Asgardians Fandral, Hogun, and Volstagg. Though the characters are gods of Asgard, they are original creations of Marvel Comics and not based on characters from Norse mythology.

The Warriors Three have appeared in various media adaptations of Thor, including the 2011 Marvel Cinematic Universe film Thor, its 2013 sequel Thor: The Dark World, and the 2017 sequel Thor: Ragnarok. They appear as archival footage in Thor: Love and Thunder.

Publication history
Fandral, Hogun, and Volstagg first appeared in Journey into Mystery #119 (Aug 1965) and were created by Stan Lee and Jack Kirby. They are first referred to as the "Warriors Three" not in a story, but in the letters page of Thor #244 (February 1976).

Although not based on Mythological Norse characters, they were each inspired from a different source, Fandral being based on actor Errol Flynn,
Hogun based on actor Charles Bronson, and Volstagg being modeled after Shakespeare's Falstaff.

The Warriors Three were the stars in issue #30 of the tryout series Marvel Spotlight. Though it did not result in the characters getting their own series, the comedy-oriented issue became a fan favorite and has been cited by writer Len Wein as one of his favorite stories: "It was just such a joy to write, and the late, great John Buscema's artwork didn't exactly hurt it no-how."

In late 2010 (with cover dates January–April 2011), the Warriors Three finally got their own four-issue mini-series, written by Bill Willingham and illustrated by Neil Edwards.

Fictional biography
The Warriors Three have played a supporting role in Marvel's Thor title since the late 1960s.

For some time, Volstagg was the coward of the group, succeeding more with luck than skill. He gained courage over time and is now more than ever, likely to be found on the front lines of battle. They first appeared when going on a quest with Thor and other Asgardians to prevent Ragnarok.

The trio have multiple adventures with their friend Thor, such as when they battled the Thermal Man. For a time, they quest with him in outer space; one of their adventures involved saving an alien world from a naive tentacled beast.

In the limited series Thor: Blood Oath (published in 2005, but chronologically set much earlier), Thor and the Warriors Three are sent on a quest as penance for accidentally killing an enemy giant during a time of peace. Although they fail in their quest, through the use of each warrior's unique capabilities, the adventure eventually comes to a good end.

The group is allied with the earth-bound group the New Mutants. During the mutants' first trip to Asgard, they drank and celebrated with Roberto da Costa (Sunspot). During the group's second visit, the Three encounter new members of the group and do not find their story of Hela's plan to kill to Odin believable. Volstagg's children do and free the group, helping them on their way. Boom Boom, Warlock and the New Mutant ally, the wolf-prince Hrimhari, rescue the Three from the fatal attentions of Queen Ula and her hive. Hrimhari's honor is enough to convince the Three and Queen Ula to join in on the attempt to defeat Hela. Other Asgardians join in on the fight and soon, Odin is saved.

When Bragi, the god of poetry, had become lost in the wilds of Asgard, just a little bit before he was due to entertain at All-Father Odin's Mid-Summer celebration, the Warriors Three braved multiple problems in order to rescue the poet and bring him home.

Another Fanfare issue focused on the wife of Ulik the Rock Troll. Despite the many attacks by Ulik against Asgardians, his wife feels she has nowhere else to go when she thinks her husband is in trouble. Hogun wants nothing to do with her, but Volstagg convinces him to at least consult with Fandral. The conclusion of the story has Ulik yet again attacking.

Ragnarok
When Thor's misunderstood brother Loki brought Ragnarök down upon Asgard, two of the warriors (Fandral and Hogun) were killed off-panel by an arrow storm launched from the deck of the flying ship Naglfar. Volstagg survived and was discovered by Thor hiding inside a statue, only now being emaciated and frail. Nevertheless, he would fight on with the army Thor had raised, which included Sif and Beta Ray Bill

Ragnarok seemingly destroyed all of Asgard and all the people residing there, which would leave all three members of The Warriors Three deceased.

Rebirth
Thor has resurfaced in the Midwest of the United States of America and has vowed to find Odin and all other Asgardians, who are hidden in human form across Earth. After finding Heimdall, Thor discovers the Warriors Three inhabiting the bodies of three volunteer guards for the Umeme Mungu Refugee Camp in Africa. The trio are restored to their true forms.

In "Secret Invasion," the Warriors Three are vital to the Asgardian victory over the Skrulls. They are part of the defense effort when Norman Osborn leads a villain army against Asgard.

After Loki's machinations to banish Thor come to fruition, the Warriors Three voluntarily leave Asgard to live in the mortal world, heading back to Broxton, Oklahoma to take over the local diner abandoned by Bill. Along with many other heroes and gods, they attend the wake of Hercules, who had fallen in battle. This meeting takes place in Athena's temple in Greece.

The trio are featured in their own limited series. In issue three, they encounter the Fenris Wolf. This backstory shows the Warriors first teamed up as the vainglorious duo of Volstagg and Fandral, to out-do each other in tasks. Hogun was a shy intellectual who went with to serve as an impartial observer.

With Volstagg serving as a politician, Fandral and Hogun acquire a new job alongside Hildegarde, who has fought with them against many dangers. Under the leadership of All-Father Thor, they are asked to serve as Asgardian jail wardens. Fandral calls this new trio "The Ministers Three."

During the "Empyre" storyline, the Warriors Three defend Little Asgard from the Cotati invaders.

In other media

Television
 The Warriors Three appear in The Super Hero Squad Show, with Fandral voiced by Tom Kenny, Volstagg voiced by Ted Biaselli, and Hogun having no dialogue.
 The Warriors Three appear in The Avengers: Earth's Mightiest Heroes, with Fandral voiced by Chris Cox, Volstagg voiced by Fred Tatasciore, and Hogun having no dialogue.
 The Warriors Three appear in the Hulk and the Agents of S.M.A.S.H. episode "For Asgard", with Fandral voiced by Benjamin Diskin, Hogun voiced by Clancy Brown, and Volstagg voiced again by Fred Tatasciore.
 The Warriors Three appear in the Guardians of the Galaxy episode "Asgard War Part One: Lightning Strikes".

Film
 The Warriors Three appear in Hulk Vs Thor, with Fandral voiced by Jonathan Holmes, Hogun voiced by Paul Dobson, and Volstagg voiced by Jay Brazeau.
 The Warriors Three appear in Thor: Tales of Asgard, with Fandral voiced by Alistair Abell, Hogun voiced by Paul Dobson and Volstagg voiced by Brent Chapman.

 The Warriors Three appeared in films set in the Marvel Cinematic Universe (MCU), with Fandral initially portrayed by Joshua Dallas and later by Zachary Levi, Hogun portrayed by Tadanobu Asano, and Volstagg portrayed by Ray Stevenson. They appear in the films Thor, Thor: The Dark World, Thor: Ragnarok, in which they are killed by Hela, and Thor: Love and Thunder via archival footage.

Video games
 The Warriors Three appear in Lego Marvel Super Heroes, with Fandral voiced by Troy Baker, Hogun voiced by Andrew Kishino, and Volstagg voiced by Fred Tatasciore. They are available via the Asgard DLC.
 The Warriors Three appear as playable characters in Marvel: Avengers Alliance.
 The Warriors Three appear as playable characters in Marvel: Future Fight.

Miscellaneous
 The MCU incarnation of the Warriors Three appear in Thor: Crown of Fools.
 The Warriors Three appear in the Tales of Asgard trilogy, written by Keith R.A. DeCandido and published by Joe Books.

Collected edition
 Thor: The Warriors Three collects Marvel Spotlight (1971) #30 and Marvel Fanfare (1982) #13, 34–37
 Warriors Three: Dog Day Afternoon collects Warriors Three #1–4, Tales to Astonish #101 and Incredible Hulk #102

References

External links
 

Comics characters introduced in 1965
Marvel Comics Asgardians
Marvel Comics characters who can move at superhuman speeds
Marvel Comics characters with accelerated healing
Marvel Comics characters with superhuman strength
Fictional characters with superhuman durability or invulnerability
Fictional trios
Characters created by Stan Lee
Characters created by Jack Kirby